SETEDIT is a computer software text editor that is an open source, multi-platform clone of the editor of Borland's Turbo* IDEs, with several improvements. According to the project page, it was started in 1996.
It is not vi or emacs, but may be familiar to DOS users, as noted in reviews.
It is the editor used by RHIDE.

SETEDIT is free software released under the GPL-2.0-or-later license.

References

External links
 SETEDIT Project Page

Free text editors